Mauro Codussi (1440–1504) was an Italian architect of the early-Renaissance, active mostly in Venice. The name is also rendered as Coducci. He was one of the first to bring the classical style of the early renaissance to Venice to replace the prevalent Gothic style.

Born near Bergamo about 1440, he is first recorded in Venice in 1469, where he was working on the church of San Michele in Isola on the island between Venice and Murano, where Venice now has its cemetery. Little is known of his early experience and training.

Other works include San Zaccaria, San Giovanni Crisostomo and Santa Maria Formosa, and the residences Ca' Vendramin Calergi and Palazzo Zorzi Galeoni.

The St Mark's Clocktower (Torre dell'Orologio), built in the Piazza San Marco in Venice between 1496 and 1499, is also attributed to him.

References
Hartt, Frederick, History of Italian Renaissance Art, (2nd edn.)1987, Thames & Hudson (US Harry N Abrams), 
 Howard, Deborah: Architectural History of Venice (2nd edition, 2004)

Notes

1440 births
1504 deaths
People from the Province of Bergamo
15th-century Italian architects
16th-century Italian architects
Architects from Venice